John Frederick Price (26 June 1901 – 27 June 1941) was an Australian rules footballer who played with  in the Victorian Football League (VFL).

Family
The son of John Price, and Annie Price, née Hunt, John Frederick Price was born at Camberwell, Victoria on 26 June 1901.

He married Emslee Margaret Gladys Murdoch in 1921.

Football
Originally playing with Carlton reserves, Price transferred to Hawthorn during the 1925 VFL season making 10 appearances and scoring 2 goals.

He subsequently played with Camberwell in the Victorian Football Association (VFA) for four seasons.

Military service
Price enlisted and served in the second AIF in the 2/2nd Pioneer Battalion (as did Max Wheeler).

Death
He was killed in action in Syria on 27 June 1941. He has no known grave, and is commemorated at the Alamein Memorial in Egypt.

See also
 List of Victorian Football League players who died in active service
 Syria–Lebanon Campaign

Notes

References
 World War Two Nominal Roll: Private John Frederick Price (VX28913), Department of Veterans' Affairs.
 Private John Frederick Price (VX28913), Commonwealth War Graves Commission.

External links 
 
 
 Jack Price's playing statistics from The VFA Project

1901 births
1941 deaths
Australian rules footballers from Melbourne
Hawthorn Football Club players
Camberwell Football Club players
Australian Army soldiers
Australian military personnel killed in World War II
Australian Army personnel of World War II
Military personnel from Melbourne
People from Camberwell, Victoria